Michael P. Walsh (born August 17, 1943) is an American vehicle emissions engineer.

Life
Walsh graduated from Manhattan College with a B.S. (1966), and studied at Princeton University (1969–70).  He worked in government service, directing motor vehicle pollution control efforts in the City of New York Department of Air Resources (1970–74) and the U.S. Environmental Protection Agency (1974–81).

Since 1981, Walsh has been an independent technical consultant on vehicle emission standards.

In 2005, he received a "genius grant" from the MacArthur Fellows Program.

Works
Air pollution from motor vehicles: standards and technologies for controlling emissions, Asif Faiz, Christopher S. Weaver, Michael P. Walsh, World Bank Publications, 1996, 
Clean fuels for Asia: technical options for moving toward unleaded gasoline and low-sulfur diesel, Michael Walsh, Jitendra J. Shah, World Bank Publications, 1997, 
Urban Air Pollution in Developing Country Megacities, Slideshare, Michael P. Walsh

References

External links

Car Lines newsletter

1943 births
21st-century American engineers
Manhattan College alumni
MacArthur Fellows
Living people